Bolivia competed at the 2015 Pan American Games in Toronto, Canada from July 10 to 26, 2015.

Sport shooter Rudolf Knijnenburg was the flagbearer for the team during the opening ceremony.

Competitors
The following table lists Bolivia's delegation per sport and gender.

Medalists

The following competitors from Bolivia won medals at the games. In the by discipline sections below, medalists' names are bolded.

| style="text-align:left; width:78%; vertical-align:top;"|

| style="text-align:left; width:22%; vertical-align:top;"|

Athletics

Bolivia qualified four athletes (one man and three women).

Track and road events

Boxing

Bolivia qualified one female boxer.

Women

Cycling

Bolivia qualified two male BMX cyclists.

BMX
Men

Golf

Bolivia qualified a team of four athletes (two men and two women).

Gymnastics

Bolivia qualified two gymnasts (one male and one female).

Artistic
Men
Bolivia qualified one male artistic gymnast.

Women
Bolivia qualified one female artistic gymnast.

Racquetball

Bolivia qualified a team of three men and three women for a total of six athletes.

Men

Women

Shooting

Bolivia qualified six shooters.

Men

Match shooting

Women

Swimming

Bolivia received two universality spots (one male and one female).

Tennis

Men

Women

Mixed

Triathlon

Bolivia received a wildcard to enter one male triathlete.

Men

Weightlifting

Bolivia received a wildcard.

Wrestling

Bolivia received one wildcard.

Greco-Roman

See also
Bolivia at the 2016 Summer Olympics

References

Nations at the 2015 Pan American Games
P
2015